Texas is home of several national sports league franchises among other professional sports, being the second most populated U.S. state. Since the state is located in the South Central United States, most teams are part of the Central / South or West league divisions, with the notable exception of the NFL Dallas Cowboys, which is an NFC East franchise.

Major league professional teams

Texas is home to 11 major league sports teams and two major women's teams.

American football

Many Texans are passionate about American football and intensely follow high school and college football teams, which often dominate social and leisure activity. Professional football is also intensely popular in Texas, and the state is home to two National Football League (NFL) franchises, the Dallas Cowboys and Houston Texans. In addition to the Cowboys and Texans, two current NFL teams previously played in the state, and one now-defunct NFL team also called the state home.

The Dallas Cowboys, founded in 1960, are one of the most popular teams in the league and have fans in many parts of the United States, leading to the nickname "America's Team". They are also one of the most successful, having reached eight Super Bowls and won five (tied with the San Francisco 49ers for second all-time). The Cowboys play their home games at AT&T Stadium in nearby Arlington, into which they moved in 2009 after having spent 38 years at Texas Stadium in Irving.

The first major-league sports team in Texas was also an NFL franchise—the Dallas Texans, which joined the league in 1952. The team's first game, however, proved to be a harbinger for the season—a 24–6 loss in front of fewer than 18,000 fans in the then-75,000-seat Cotton Bowl. Home attendance continued to slump, dropping to 10,000 for a loss that left the team 0–7. The team owners, unable to make payroll, returned the Texans to the league, and the team played the rest of the 1952 season as a traveling team, never returning to Texas. After the season, the NFL folded the Texans, making them the last NFL team to permanently cease operations.

In the same year that the Cowboys entered the NFL, the American Football League (AFL) began operations with two teams in the state—the Dallas Texans and Houston Oilers. The new Texans shared the Cotton Bowl with the Cowboys, while the Oilers played at Jeppesen Stadium (now the site of the University of Houston's TDECU Stadium). The Texans and Cowboys shared the city and stadium through the 1962 season; while the Texans enjoyed more on-field success, including an AFL title in 1962, the team's owner Lamar Hunt concluded that Dallas could not support two professional football teams and moved the Texans to Kansas City, Missouri, where they play to this day as the Kansas City Chiefs. The Oilers moved from Jeppesen Stadium to the larger Rice Stadium after the 1964 season, and then joined baseball's Houston Astros at the Astrodome in 1968. Two years later, the merger that the AFL and NFL had agreed to in 1966 took effect, with all AFL franchises being incorporated into the NFL. The Oilers remained at the Astrodome into the 1990s, but the failure of team owner Bud Adams to reach an agreement with the city on a new stadium led to his moving the franchise to Nashville, Tennessee, where it was renamed the Tennessee Titans.

The NFL returned to Houston in 2002 with the debut of the current Texans, who play their home games at NRG Stadium, the first NFL stadium with a retractable roof.

In 2020, the Dallas Renegades and Houston Roughnecks launched as inaugural teams in the new XFL.

Baseball

Baseball has a strong presence in Texas, with two Major League Baseball (MLB) teams. The Houston Astros (originally the "Colt .45s") started playing in 1962. The Texas Rangers debuted in 1972 after relocating from Washington, D.C. In 2005, the Astros became the first team in Texas to make it to the World Series. The Rangers followed the Astros in 2010 to their first World Series and the following year as well. In 2017, the Astros became the first team in Texas to win the World Series.

Minor League Baseball (MiLB) is also closely followed in Texas—especially in the smaller metropolitan areas. As of the 2022 season, three teams play in the Triple-A Pacific Coast League: the El Paso Chihuahuas, Round Rock Express, and Sugar Land Space Cowboys. Five teams play in the Double-A Texas League: the Amarillo Sod Poodles, Corpus Christi Hooks, Frisco RoughRiders, Midland RockHounds, and San Antonio Missions. The Fort Worth Cats were a team in Fort Worth that won three-straight championships in independent leagues, one in the Central Baseball League and the last two in the American Association.

College baseball is also quite popular, as Texas A&M University, Rice University, University of Texas at Austin, University of Houston, Baylor University, Texas Tech University, and Texas Christian University have all made multiple Men's College World Series appearances.

Basketball

Basketball is also popular, and Texas hosts three NBA teams: the San Antonio Spurs, the Houston Rockets, and the Dallas Mavericks. All three have won championships, however the Spurs having won at least 50 games for 18 consecutive seasons and winning 5 NBA championships, are arguably the best professional franchise in Texas sports and are considered one of the best NBA franchises in history. The Houston Rockets did however distinguish themselves as the first team in Texas to win an NBA Finals.

Texas is home to one WNBA team, the Dallas Wings, which relocated from Tulsa, Oklahoma after the 2015 season. The state had two other WNBA teams, the Houston Comets and San Antonio Stars. The Comets, a founding member of the WNBA, won the league's first four championships (1997–2000), but folded after the 2008 season. The Stars were also a founding member of the WNBA as the Salt Lake City-based Utah Starzz, and moved to San Antonio when the team was bought by the Spurs' parent company, Spurs Sports & Entertainment (SSE), before the 2003 season. The team then took the identity of San Antonio Silver Stars, dropping the word "Silver" after the 2013 season. After the 2017 season, SSE sold the Stars to MGM Resorts International, which moved the team to Las Vegas as the Las Vegas Aces.

At the collegiate level, the state is home to two NCAA Division I Men's Championship teams: the Texas Western Miners (now UTEP Miners) team, who won the 1966 NCAA University Division basketball tournament (the historic predecessor to today's Division I men's tournament), and the Baylor Bears, who won the 2021 NCAA Division I men's basketball tournament.  In women's collegiate basketball, several teams have won championships, including the Texas Tech Lady Raiders, Texas Longhorns, Texas A&M Aggies, and Baylor Bears.

Texas also has a statewide championship recreational basketball league, Shamrock Basketball Association.

Horse racing
From 1905–1915, people in Dallas and Fort Worth turned out by the thousands for horse racing, which was usually tied to the state fair schedule. Dallas established a Jockey Club early on. The Fort Worth Driving Club (for owners of Standardbred trotters and pacers) had 101 members when it opened in 1905. Trotters raced at a park in Fort Worth, but both cities attracted thousands of people for each style of racing.

Lone Star Park, in the Dallas–Fort Worth suburb of Grand Prairie, hosted the Breeders' Cup, the climax to the American Thoroughbred racing season, in 2004.

Ice hockey

Ice hockey has been a growing participatory sport in the Dallas-Fort Worth area since the Minnesota North Stars of the National Hockey League (NHL) became the Dallas Stars in 1993. The Stars made the Stanley Cup playoffs their first year in Dallas and remained competitive through the rest of decade, culminating in a Stanley Cup championship in 1999. The team returned to the Stanley Cup Finals the next year, only to lose to the New Jersey Devils. In addition to the 1999 Stanley Cup and 2000 Western Conference championship, the team has also won two Presidents' Trophies as the NHL's regular-season points champion and seven division titles.

Prior to the advent of the Stars, top-tier professional ice hockey existed in Texas in the form of the Houston Aeros, who played in the World Hockey Association (WHA) from 1973 to 1978. The team was notable for featuring hockey legend Gordie Howe, who was lured out of retirement by the prospect of playing alongside his sons, Mark and Marty. Led by the Howes, the Aeros won back-to-back Avco World Trophies as the WHA champions in 1974 and 1975. The Aeros folded after they failed to gain admission into the NHL, first as part of a merger between the WHA and NHL and then as an expansion team.

Minor league professional hockey has also become popular in the last several decades. The Houston Huskies played in the old United States Hockey League (USHL) and won its championship in 1948, led by legendary NHL coach Toe Blake. In 1994, Houston received a franchise in the International Hockey League (IHL), which was named the Aeros after the city's old WHA side. The new Aeros won the IHL's Turner Cup in 1999. In 2001, the team transferred to the American Hockey League (AHL) after the IHL's demise; it won the AHL's Calder Cup in 2003 and reached the Calder Cup Finals in 2011. The AHL has established two more teams in Texas since that time – the San Antonio Rampage (owned by the NBA's San Antonio Spurs and affiliated with the NHL's Colorado Avalanche) began play in 2002, and the Texas Stars (an AHL affiliate of the Dallas Stars based in the Austin suburb of Cedar Park), began play seven years later. In 2013 the Aeros would leave Texas to become the Iowa Wild.

Between 1992 and 2014, the Central Hockey League had fifteen different teams based in Texas and as many as nine from 2002 to 2005. However, by the CHL's final season, only the Allen Americans remained. The Americans joined the ECHL in 2014 and went on to win the championship in their first season in the league.

Soccer

The major professional North American Soccer League had teams in the Dallas/Fort Worth area, Houston, and in San Antonio.  The Dallas Tornado played between 1968–1981 (winning the 1971 Soccer Bowl), the Houston Stars played for one season in 1968, and the San Antonio Thunder played for two seasons, 1975–1976.  Houston returned to the league in 1978 as the Hurricanes and played until 1980.  Soccer returned to Texas with the 1994 FIFA World Cup with the Cotton Bowl hosting matches.

In 1996, the Dallas Burn was born as one of 10 founding members of Major League Soccer, which is the current Division 1 professional soccer league overseen by the U.S. Soccer Federation. The Dallas Burn were later renamed FC Dallas with a new logo and colors, and now play in a soccer-specific stadium called Toyota Stadium in Frisco. A second Texas team, Houston Dynamo FC, joined MLS in 2006 (with "FC" added to the club branding in 2020). The Dynamo won the MLS Cup in their first year in Houston, and again in their second year in 2007. Dynamo FC now plays at Shell Energy Stadium, a soccer-specific stadium near downtown Houston. Texas received its third MLS team in 2021 with the arrival of Austin FC. The city had originally been planned as the future home of the Columbus Crew, but the move proved controversial, triggering lawsuits by the city of Columbus and state of Ohio. The dispute was settled with an investment group led by the owners of the Cleveland Browns buying the Crew, while former Crew owner Anthony Precourt received a new Austin team.

Before the Austin FC deal was finalized, MLS Commissioner Don Garber had stated publicly that a third city in Texas—either San Antonio or Austin—was under consideration for a possible MLS expansion franchise. At that time, only San Antonio had a professional minor league soccer team; San Antonio FC play in the second-tier USL Championship, but another Texas team, Austin Bold FC, joined in 2019. Bold FC effectively replaced the Austin Aztex, which joined the USL Championship in 2015, when the competition was known as the United Soccer League, but only played one season. The Aztex went on hiatus while seeking to build a new stadium, but eventually folded after being unable to secure a site. Eventually, a new deal for a stadium on the grounds of the Circuit of the Americas emerged, clearing the way for Bold FC to join the league. Bold FC isn't currently active in the league, pending a move to Fort Worth. Texas currently has three active teams in the USL Championship—Rio Grande Valley FC Toros, which began play in 2016 as the reserve side of the Dynamo, San Antonio FC which also began play in 2016, and El Paso Locomotive FC, which started play in 2019. Another professional team, North Texas SC, began play in 2019 as the reserve side of FC Dallas, playing in the newly launched third-level USL League One. It has since moved to another third-level league, MLS Next Pro, which began play in 2022 as the de facto successor to MLS' former reserve league.

In 2014, the Houston Dash, owned and operated by Dynamo FC and also playing at Shell Energy Stadium, joined the National Women's Soccer League, the country's current top-level women's league.

The Cotton Bowl in Dallas hosted six matches during the 1994 FIFA World Cup. During the 2026 FIFA World Cup, matches will be held at AT&T Stadium in the Dallas-Fort Worth Metroplex and NRG Stadium in Houston. Along with California, Texas is one of two states which will host 2026 FIFA World Cup matches at two stadiums in their respective state.

Collegiate

Originally, most Texas Division I universities were part of the Southwest Conference until it dissolved in 1996. The twelve schools whose football teams compete at the Division I FBS level are the Baylor Bears, TCU Horned Frogs, Texas Longhorns, and Texas Tech Red Raiders of the Big 12 Conference; the Texas A&M Aggies of the Southeastern Conference; the SMU Mustangs and Houston Cougars of the American Athletic Conference; the North Texas Mean Green, Rice Owls, UTEP Miners, and UTSA Roadrunners of Conference USA; and the Texas State Bobcats of the Sun Belt Conference. The Sam Houston Bearkats, currently a member of the Division I FCS Western Athletic Conference, will join Conference USA in 2023. Texas has the most FBS schools in the United States.

According to a survey of FBS coaches, the rivalry between the University of Oklahoma and the University of Texas at Austin, the Red River Shootout, ranks the third-best in the nation. A fierce rivalry, the Lone Star Showdown, also exists between the two state's largest universities, Texas A&M University and the University of Texas. This athletic rivalry has been put on hold after the Aggies joined the Southeastern Conference in 2012, but is likely to resume when the Longhorns move to the SEC in 2024. The SMU Mustangs and Texas Christian University Horned Frogs have a rivalry called the Battle for the Iron Skillet.  The Houston–Rice rivalry exists between the University of Houston and Rice University with a large focus on the Bayou Bucket Classic.

Texas is home to many other Division I programs with football teams competing in Division I FCS. In addition to the aforementioned Sam Houston, these include the Abilene Christian Wildcats, Stephen F. Austin Lumberjacks, and Tarleton Texans of the Western Athletic Conference (WAC); the Houston Christian Huskies, Incarnate Word Cardinals, Lamar Cardinals, and Texas A&M–Commerce Lions of the Southland Conference; and the Prairie View A&M Panthers and Texas Southern Tigers of the Southwestern Athletic Conference. The WAC, which had shut down its FBS football league after the 2012 season, following the departure of nearly all of its football schools, reinstated football at the FCS level in July 2021, coinciding with the arrival of Abilene Christian, Lamar, Sam Houston, and Stephen F. Austin from the Southland. However, WAC football entered a period of flux with Incarnate Word backing out of its planned 2022 move from the Southland, soon followed by Lamar accelerating its planned 2023 return to the Southland by a year. Eventually, the WAC and ASUN Conference announced they would fully merge their respective FCS football leagues in 2023 under the tentative name of ASUN–WAC Football Conference. Rivalries include the Battle of the Piney Woods between Sam Houston and Stephen F. Austin and another between Prairie View A&M and Texas Southern.

In addition, the state has three Division I programs that do not sponsor football—the Texas A&M–Corpus Christi Islanders of the Southland Conference, and the UT Arlington Mavericks and UTRGV Vaqueros of the WAC. UTRGV has announced plans to establish an FCS football program no later than 2025.

Collegiate teams nationwide see Texas as an American football recruiting hotbed. In 2006, 170 players in the NFL came from Texas high schools.

High school
Most primary and secondary school athletic, music, and academic contests in Texas involving public schools are organized and administered by the University Interscholastic League (UIL). As a general rule, the UIL only governs public schools. Private schools are governed by other bodies, the largest of which is the Texas Association of Private and Parochial Schools (TAPPS). Both bodies have similar governing scope, although some terminology differs. The TAPPS category of "fine arts" encompasses what UIL calls "academic" and "music" competitions, and also includes competitions for spirit squads (i.e., cheerleading and dance teams), which UIL does not sponsor (other bodies govern cheer/dance competitions among public schools).

Rodeo

Texans also enjoy going to the rodeo. The annual Houston Livestock Show and Rodeo is the largest rodeo in the world. The event begins with trail rides that originate from several points throughout the state, all of which convene at Reliant Park. The world's first rodeo was held in Pecos, Texas on July 4, 1883. The Southwestern Exposition and Livestock Show in Fort Worth, Texas has a cowboy, and a Mexican and many traditional rodeos. The State Fair of Texas is held in Dallas, Texas each year at Fair Park.

Gymnastics
Gymnastics in Texas is very popular and is one of the largest states for the sport in the country. Multiple Olympians and World Champions have come out of the state including; Nastia Liukin (2008 Olympic AA Champion), Carly Patterson (2004 Olympic AA Champion) and Simone Biles (2013, 2014, and 2015 World AA Champion and 2016 Olympic all-around champion). Madison Kocian (2015 world uneven bars champion).

There are many gymnastics clubs in Texas but the top facilities include World Olympic Gymnastics Academy (Plano & Frisco), Texas Dreams Gymnastics (Coppell) and Metroplex Gymnastics (Allen).

The Women's U.S. National Gymnastics Training Center had been just outside Houston, at the Karolyi Ranch in Huntsville, Texas, from 2001 to 2018, when Karolyi Ranch closed permanently in the wake of the USA Gymnastics sex abuse scandal.

Plano, Texas is considered the "gymnastics capital of the world" because of the gymnastics academy, WOGA.

Golf

Texas hosts five PGA Tour golf tournaments: WGC Match Play, Houston Open, Texas Open, Byron Nelson Classic, and Colonial National Invitational. Other professional tournaments in the state are the North Texas LPGA Shootout and the Insperity Invitational. Notable Texan golfers include Ben Hogan, Byron Nelson, Jimmy Demaret, Tom Kite, Ben Crenshaw, Jordan Spieth, Lee Trevino, and Kathy Whitworth.

Motorsport

The state is home to motorsport venues such as the Texas Motor Speedway in Fort Worth, which hosts NASCAR and IndyCar races, and the Texas World Speedway in College Station. The Circuit of the Americas near Austin hosts the United States Grand Prix in Formula One and the Motorcycle Grand Prix of the Americas in MotoGP.

Texas Motorplex and Houston Raceway Park dragstrips host rounds of the NHRA Mello Yello Drag Racing Series. Dallas and Houston have hosted street races, the Dallas Grand Prix and the Grand Prix of Houston, as well as AMA Supercross Championship rounds.

Auto racing is also the second most watched sport on TV in the state, behind American football. NASCAR races tend to do well in Texas media markets than NBA games.

Esports
Major esports organizations located in Texas:

Other sports
Another popular sport in Texas is year-round fishing. Lacrosse, originally played by some of the indigenous tribes, is growing in popularity.

Notable professional league and amateur teams

Notes

Stadiums and arenas

Notes

See also
 AT&T SportsNet Southwest
 Comcast/Charter Sports Southeast
 Fox Sports Southwest
 Houston Astros Radio Network

References

External links